St. Nicholas' Church, Puthiyathura in the Archdiocese of Trivandrum, is a former church in Trivandrum, Kerala. Hindus, Muslims and Christians celebrate the Holy Feast together. The church was built in the 19th century. It was dedicated to Saint Nicholas, the patron of fishermen and sailors. Chinna Marthandam, was the name of this place before Indian Independence. At that time it was under the province of Travancore.

Roman Catholic churches in Thiruvananthapuram